The Timor leaf warbler (Phylloscopus presbytes) is a species of Old World warbler in the family Phylloscopidae.
It is found on Timor island. Its closest relative is the Rote leaf warbler.

References

Timor leaf warbler
Birds of Timor
Timor leaf warbler
Timor leaf warbler
Taxonomy articles created by Polbot